Dmitri Sergeyevich Yushkevich (born November 19, 1971) is a Russian former professional ice hockey defenceman. He spent 11 seasons in the National Hockey League with several teams, but most notably for the Toronto Maple Leafs.

Playing career
Dmitri Yushkevich was drafted in the sixth round, 122nd overall, by the Philadelphia Flyers in the 1991 NHL Entry Draft. After eleven seasons in the National Hockey League (NHL), he returned to the Russian Superleague (RSL) in 2003.

After winning a gold medal at the 1992 Winter Olympics,  Yushkevich made his NHL debut with the Flyers in the 1992–93 season. He appeared in all 82 games in his rookie season, tallying five goals and adding 27 assists. After three seasons with the Flyers, Yushkevich joined the Toronto Maple Leafs before the 1995–96 season.

In Toronto, Yushkevich blossomed into a top-pair caliber NHL defenceman, particularly under the guidance of coach Pat Quinn, who joined the team in 1998. Between 1998–99 and 2001–02, Yushkevich also emerged as the leader of the Maple Leafs' defense corps. During the 1999 playoffs, Yushkevich paired up with Danny Markov to neutralize Penguins' superstar Jaromír Jágr, thus helping the Leafs advance to the Eastern Conference finals. Yushkevich earned a spot in the 2000 NHL All-Star game, which took place in Toronto. In February 2002, Yushkevich was diagnosed with a life-threatening blood clot. As a result, Yushkevich was forced to miss the rest of the 2001–02 season. Despite Yushkevich's pleas to accept the risk and re-join the club in time for the playoffs, he was not cleared to play by the team. As a Maple Leaf, Yushkevich totalled 506 regular season games and 44 playoff games. His performances with the Leafs earned him a reputation of a warrior, a grinder, and an expert shot-blocker. He was traded to the Florida Panthers before the 2002–03 season for Róbert Švehla.

After only 23 games with the Panthers, Yushkevich was traded again. The Los Angeles Kings acquired him, along with a draft pick, in exchange for Andreas Lilja and Jaroslav Bednář. Yushkevich would join his third team of the 2002–03 season in March, when the Kings traded him back to Philadelphia for a pair of draft picks.

In the 2003–04 season, Yushkevich returned to Russia to play for Lokomotiv Yaroslavl of the Russian Superleague. He then joined his hometown Severstal Cherepovets for the 2004–05 season before moving on to Metallurg Magnitogorsk for the 2005–06 season. For the 2006–07 season, he played for SKA St. Petersburg. He then returned to his hometown team of Severstal Cherepovets.

Yushkevich decided to retire in January 2008 after the death of his first wife Oksana so that he could take care of their three children.

Yushkevich was a member of the Russian national team at the 1998 Winter Olympics, earning a silver medal.

Yushkevich has since come out of retirement and is playing for Sibir Novosibirsk of the recently formed Kontinental Hockey League (KHL). He led all defenceman on the team in scoring.

On the 3rd of November 2009 it was announced that the Finnish hockey team Kärpät have recruited him.

Yushkevich was named among 145 other inductees as the first group to be inducted into the Russian Hockey Hall of Fame on February 17, 2014.

Career statistics

Regular season and playoffs

International

Awards
Champion of CIS:  1992 (With Dinamo)
NHL All-Star Game winner:  2000
Russian champion:  2007 (With Metallurg Magnitogorsk)
Winner of Turnir Puchkova:  2007

References

External links
 

1971 births
Florida Panthers players
HC Dynamo Moscow players
Metallurg Magnitogorsk players
HC Sibir Novosibirsk players
Ice hockey players at the 1992 Winter Olympics
Ice hockey players at the 1998 Winter Olympics
Oulun Kärpät players
Living people
Lokomotiv Yaroslavl players
Los Angeles Kings players
National Hockey League All-Stars
Olympic gold medalists for the Unified Team
Olympic ice hockey players of Russia
Olympic ice hockey players of the Unified Team
Olympic medalists in ice hockey
Olympic silver medalists for Russia
People from Cherepovets
Philadelphia Flyers draft picks
Philadelphia Flyers players
Russia men's national ice hockey team coaches
Russian ice hockey defencemen
Severstal Cherepovets players
SKA Saint Petersburg players
Soviet ice hockey defencemen
Toronto Maple Leafs players
Medalists at the 1998 Winter Olympics
Medalists at the 1992 Winter Olympics
Sportspeople from Vologda Oblast